Robert Anthony Brown, Jr. (born September 29, 1980) is a former American football defensive tackle. He was signed by the Carolina Panthers as an undrafted free agent in 2003. He played college football at Memphis.

Brown was also member of the Miami Dolphins, San Francisco 49ers, and Tennessee Titans.

The Titans released Brown on July 28, 2011.

References

External links
Tennessee Titans bio

1980 births
Living people
Sportspeople from Chattanooga, Tennessee
American football defensive tackles
American football defensive ends
Memphis Tigers football players
Carolina Panthers players
Miami Dolphins players
San Francisco 49ers players
Amsterdam Admirals players
Tennessee Titans players